Daniel Marmenlind (born 14 November 1997) is a Swedish ice hockey goaltender. He is currently playing with Malmö Redhawks of the Swedish Hockey League.

Playing career
Marmenlind started his career in the youth ranks of Wings HC Arlanda, Djurgårdens IF and Örebro HK. In 2015–16, Marmenlind logged his first minutes in Sweden's top-flight Swedish Hockey League (SHL) with Örebro HK and was temporarily loaned to Wings HC Arlanda and IFK Arboga of the Swedish Hockeyettan.

Marmenlind was considered one of the top goaltender prospects in the 2016 NHL Entry Draft. Despite this he went undrafted in both 2016 and 2017.

Career statistics

Regular season and playoffs

References

External links

1997 births
Living people
Malmö Redhawks players
Örebro HK players
Swedish ice hockey goaltenders
Sportspeople from Uppsala
HC Vita Hästen players
Västerviks IK players